Phyllis Shannaw (3 May 1901 – 1988) was an English actress in silent films and the London stage. Her husband Frank Cellier was also an actor, as is her son, Peter Cellier.

Early life 
Phyllis Maud Shannaw was born in Richmond, Surrey. She was educated at Wentworth Hall in Mill Hill.

Career 
Shannaw was in musical comedies and revues as a young woman. She appeared in five silent films: The Call of the Road (1920), The River of Light (1921), The Right to Live (1921), The Fifth Form at St. Dominic's (1921), and The Sport of Kings (1921). Her stage credits included London productions of The Limpet (1922), The Merry Wives of Windsor (1923-1924), The Mask and the Face (1924), and The Torch Bearers (1925). Shannaw "showed that, in addition to being able to act, she has a voice that is beautiful, quiet, dignified, and expressive," according to a theatre reviewer in 1922.

Personal life 
In 1925, Phyllis Shannaw became the second wife of Frank Cellier, son of conductor François Cellier and father of actress Antoinette Cellier. They had a son, Peter Cellier, who also became an actor. Frank Cellier died in 1948. She died in 1988, in Surrey, aged 86 years.

References

External links 

 
 

1901 births
1988 deaths
English stage actresses
English silent film actresses
People from Surrey
20th-century English actresses